Captain William Ernest Reed,  was an English World War I flying ace credited with nine aerial victories. He continued in military service until 1938.

Early life
William Ernest Reed was born at Jarrow, Tyneside, on 23 March 1896.

World War I
Reed first served as a corporal in the Tyne Electrical Engineers, before being commissioned as a second lieutenant in the Durham Fortress Engineers on 25 June 1915. Both were Royal Engineers units of the Territorial Force, engaged in coastal defence works in the north-east.

On 5 September 1916 Reed was seconded for duty in the Royal Flying Corps, and was appointed a flying officer the same day. He was posted to No. 19 Squadron, and claimed his first aerial victory while on a bomber escort mission, on 14 April 1917. He scored again eight days later, but was wounded by ground fire in the process. On 10 May 1917 Flight magazine reported Reed as wounded in action. A week later, Flight noted that Reed had been mentioned in despatches.

On 1 July 1917 he was promoted to lieutenant, with precedence from 1 June 1916, in the Royal Engineers, while remaining seconded to the RFC.

On 1 April 1918 Reed was appointed a temporary captain "whilst so employed" to serve as a flight commander in the newly formed No. 92 Squadron. He scored seven aerial victories with them between August and October, but was wounded again on 3 November 1918. His exploits earned him the Distinguished Flying Cross, which would not be gazetted until 8 February 1919. His citation read:
Lieutenant (Acting-Captain) William Ernest Reed.
"A brilliant and skilful scout leader. On 29th October, although seriously handicapped by clouds, he led a successful patrol over the enemy lines. Attacking a large formation of enemy machines, his own formation accounted for five, he himself destroying one and driving down another out of control. In addition to these he has to his credit three other enemy aircraft."

List of aerial victories

Post-war career
On 25 March 1921 Reed relinquished his temporary commission in the Royal Air Force, upon his appointment into the Territorial Force; he retained the courtesy rank of captain. On 11 April was commissioned as a lieutenant in the 50th (Northumbrian) Divisional Engineers (Territorial Force).

Between 24 May and 8 July 1921 he served as a temporary lieutenant in the Defence Force, a unit "formed to help maintain law and order, and to render any necessary assistance in protecting those employed on carrying on the essential services of the country, without which the people of the country might starve", during the industrial unrest around the 1921 miner's strike. On 7 October 1921 he was promoted to captain in the 50th (Northumbrian) Divisional Engineers. He eventually resigned his commission on 15 October 1938.

References

Bibliography
 

1896 births
Year of death missing
People from Jarrow
Royal Engineers soldiers
Royal Engineers officers
Royal Flying Corps officers
Royal Air Force personnel of World War I
British World War I flying aces
Recipients of the Distinguished Flying Cross (United Kingdom)
Territorial Force officers